Auguste René Rozet (1858–1939) was a French sculptor and medalist. He produced portrait medallions, portrait busts, tympanum, and statuettes. A common subject of his work was children.

Biography 

He was born on 14 May 1858 in Paris. Rozet studied with Pierre-Jules Cavelier, Charles Joshua Chaplin, Guillaume Charles Tasset, and Aimé Millet. 

In 1905, he was elected as a member of the Académie des Beaux-Arts. In 1912, he was honored with the Legion of Honour award. In 1927, at the Salon des Artistes Français he won the Hors concours, a gold medal.

His work is in museum collections, including at the Musée d'Orsay, and Museum of Applied Arts.

His daughter was artist Fanny Rozet.

References 

1858 births
1939 deaths
Artists from Paris
French medallists
French sculptors
20th-century French sculptors
19th-century French sculptors